Ministrówka  is a village in the administrative district of Gmina Miączyn, within Zamość County, Lublin Voivodeship, in eastern Poland. It lies approximately 2 kilometres (about 1.24 mi) north-west of Miączyn, 17 km ( about 10.56 mi) east of Zamość, and 85 km (about 52.82 mi) south-east of the regional capital Lublin.

References

Villages in Zamość County